The Faber-Ward House is a historic three-story home in Charleston, South Carolina. Henry F. Faber built the house about 1832 in a  Palladian style reminiscent of  Southern plantations. The house was converted into a hotel for African-Americans after the American Civil War and then a middle-class residence. 

In 1964, the Historic Charleston Foundation bought the house and undertook a restoration of the then-abandoned building.

References

Further reading
Jonathan H. Poston, The Buildings of Charleston: A Guide to the City's Architecture. Columbia, South Carolina: University of South Carolina Press, 1997.

Houses in Charleston, South Carolina
Houses completed in 1832
Palladian Revival architecture in the United States